The 1964 Prague Skate was a senior international figure skating competition held in Czechoslovakia in December 1964. It was the inaugural edition of the annual international event. Medals were awarded in the disciplines of men's singles, ladies' singles, pair skating, and ice dancing. Czechoslovakia took the top two spots in the ice dancing competition, with gold going to the reigning world champions Eva Romanová / Pavel Roman. A future Olympic champion, Ondrej Nepela of Czechoslovakia, won the men's title ahead of East Germany's Günter Zöller. The reigning European bronze medalist, Nicole Hassler of France, took the ladies' title by defeating East Germany's Gabriele Seyfert, a future Olympic medalist, and former European medalist Jana Mrázková of Czechoslovakia.

Men

Ladies

Pairs

Ice dancing

References

Prague Skate
Prague Skate